Raymond Sharp (born 16 November 1969) is a Scottish former footballer, who played for Dunfermline Athletic, Stenhousemuir, Preston North End, Forfar Athletic, Alloa Athletic, Cowdenbeath, East Fife and Montrose.

Sharp made four appearances for the Scotland national under-21 football team.

References

External links 

1969 births
Living people
Footballers from Stirling
Association football fullbacks
Scottish footballers
Dunfermline Athletic F.C. players
Stenhousemuir F.C. players
Preston North End F.C. players
Forfar Athletic F.C. players
Alloa Athletic F.C. players
Cowdenbeath F.C. players
East Fife F.C. players
Montrose F.C. players
Scottish Football League players
English Football League players
Scotland under-21 international footballers
Oakley United F.C. players